Ray Liberti (born 1945/1946) is an American politician. He served as a Democratic member for the 78th and 82nd district of the Florida House of Representatives.

In 1978, Liberti won the election for the 78th district of the Florida House of Representatives. He succeeded Donald F. Hazelton. In 1982, Liberti was succeeded by Dale Patchett for the 78th district. In the same year, he won the election for the 82nd district of the Florida House of Representatives. Liberti succeeded Doc Kimmel. In 1992, Liberti was succeeded by Tom Warner for the 82nd district. In 2006, he was charged in the federal judiciary. In two cases, Liberti was entreated to not being guilty from a mail and wire fraud. He was then entreated to being guilty in a mail and wire fraud case.

Liberti served as a commissioner for the Republic Properties Corporation, where he had assisted to support the company.

References 

1940s births
Living people
Place of birth missing (living people)
Democratic Party members of the Florida House of Representatives
20th-century American politicians